Taitsing was a famous British tea clipper.

Tea Clipper Taitsing

She was built in 1865 by Charles Connell & Co, Glasgow, Scotland, for Findlay & Longmuir, Greenock, Scotland.

The ship sailed from London to Chinese ports like Amoy, Hong Kong, Wusong, Fuzhou, and Shanghai. She also travelled from Fuzhou to New York in 1874. In 1876 the ship was sold to James Findlay of Greenock. She was sold to John Willis & Son [Robert D. Willis] of London in 1879.

The Great Tea Race of 1866

Laden with just over a million pounds (453,600 kg) of tea, Taitsing, under the command of Captain Nutsford, raced nine other ships from China to England in The Great Tea Race of 1866. The first five ships – Taiping, Ariel, Serica, Fiery Cross, and Taitsing – finished the 14,000-nautical-mile (25,930-km) race within three days of each other. Taitsing arrived fifth, in "the closest run ever recorded." Taitsing′s best 24-hour run during the race was on 2 July 1866, when she traveled , averaging ).

Sinking

Taitsing, carrying a load of patent fuel from Swansea, Wales, sank in the Indian Ocean off Nyuni Island, Zanzibar, on 20 September 1883.

In culture

A painting of Taitsing signed by the Chinese painter Hingqua, along with a painting of the clipper brig Venus, sold at auction at Sotheby's in New York City in 2009.

References

Further reading

External links

Paintings
 The Ship Taitsing entering Hong Kong, July 1877
 Clipper ship Taitsing China trade portrait
 China Trade oil on canvas of Taitsing, 1865-2870
 "Ship TAITSING Visiting China", David Thimgan, 1955-2003
 Taitsing, composite ship picture by David Michael Hartigan Little
 "Fleeting Colors", British Tea Clipper Taitsing, 1866-67, by Jim Griffiths, Maritime Gallery at Mystic Seaport

Scale model

 Model built to a scale of 32 feet to one inch. Based on plans from: 
 Scale model of Taitsing

Clippers
Individual sailing vessels
Tall ships of the United Kingdom
Victorian-era merchant ships of the United Kingdom
Ships built in Glasgow
Shipwrecks in the Indian Ocean
Maritime incidents in September 1883
1865 ships
Full-rigged ships